The 1933–34 Copa México was the 18th staging of this Mexican football cup competition that existed from 1907.

The competition started on July 1, 1934, and concluded on July 15, 1934, and Asturias won the trophy for the fourth time after a 3–0 victory over Necaxa.

Preliminary round

Final phase

References
Mexico - Statistics of Copa México in season 1933/1934. (RSSSF)

Copa Mexico, 1933-34
Copa MX
Copa